

Events 
Reform Mayor Fiorello La Guardia is elected mayor of New York City.
Recently released from prison, Salvatore "Sam" "Mooney" Giancana becomes a bodyguard and chauffeur to Antonino "Tony," "Joe Batters" Accardo. 
Walter Sage, a member of Brooklyn's Abe Reles-Harry Maione gang, is stabbed to death by Murder, Inc. assassin "Pittsburg Phil" Harry Strauss.
January 24 – Charles "King" Solomon, the leading Prohibition bootlegger in Boston's underworld, is killed at the Cotton Club in South Boston. 
March 7 – Salvatore Sabella, along with John Avena and Domenico Pollina, are acquitted for a 1927 gangland slaying. 
May 30 – Sebastiano Domingo aka Buster from Chicago killed in New York City; five others wounded-of whom one died.
June 17 – In an attempt to free bank robber Frank "Jelly" Nash from federal custody, Verne Miller, Charles "Pretty Boy" Floyd, and Adam Richetti, ambush federal agents and local police at the Kansas City Union Station parking lot resulting in the deaths of FBI Agent Raymond J. Caffrey, Oklahoma, Police Chief Otto Reed, Kansas City Policemen W. J. Grooms and Frank Hermanson, as well as Frank Nash himself. The event would become known as the "Kansas City Massacre". 
August 12 – Gas Fascone, a gunman for Kansas City mobster John Lazia, is shot and killed by police after murdering Joe Lusco lieutenant Ferris Anthon. 
October 9 – Gus Winkler, a gambler and bootlegger on Chicago's West Side (or North Side), is machine gunned to death. Winkler was suspected to have been involved in planning the St. Valentine's Day Massacre.
November 29 – Vernon C. Miller, an associate of New York mobster Louis "Lepke" Buchalter and one of the surviving gunmen of the Kansas City Massacre, is found murdered in Detroit (possibly members of New Jersey mobster Abner Zwillman's organization).
December 5 – Prohibition ends following the ratification of the 21st Amendment.

Arts and literature
Lady Killer (film)  starring James Cagney.

Births
Khun Sa "Opium King", Burmese warlord and opium dealer.
Stephen Maltese, Genovese crime family associate 
August 8 – Carmine Persico "The Snake", Colombo crime family, boss
October 2 – Aniello Migliore, Lucchese crime family underboss
November 14 – Danny Greene "The Irishman", Cleveland gangster

Deaths
Walter Sage, Brooklyn mobster and associate of Abe Reles-Harry Maione gang 
January 24 – Charles Solomon, Boston Prohibition gangster 
May 30 – Sebastiano Domingo aka Buster from Chicago killed in New York City
June 17 – Frank Nash "Jelly", St. Louis gangster and victim of the Kansas City Massacre 
June 17 – Raymond J. Caffrey, FBI Agent and victim of the Kansas City Massacre
August 12 – Ferris Anthon Joe Lusco lieutenant
August 12 – Gas Fascone, Kansas City mobster 
October 9 – Gus Winkler, Chicago (West Side) mobster involved in illegal gambling and bootlegging
November 29 – Vernon C. Miller, associate of New York mobster Louis "Lepke" Buchalter and participant in the Kansas City Massacre

Years in organized crime
Organized crime